Arthur Forbes Gordon Kilby  (3 February 1885 – 25 September 1915) was an English officer in the British Army during the First World War, and recipient of the Victoria Cross.

Early life
Forbes was born on 3 February 1885 in East Hayes, Cheltenham, the only son of Sandford and Alice F. Kilby, He was educated at Bilton Grange near Rugby and Winchester College. He graduated from the Royal Military College, Sandhurst in 1905, and was commissioned into the South Staffordshire Regiment.

Military career
Kilby was promoted to Captain on 1 April 1910 when he was only 25. An accomplished linguist, he was fluent in Hungarian and German, and when war broke out in August 1914 he was learning Spanish. He was posted to the British Expeditionary Force in France and Flanders with the 2nd Battalion, The South Staffordshire Regiment during the First World War.

Kilby was 30 years old, and a captain when he performed an act for which he was awarded the VC and during which he died. He was killed in action on 25 September 1915 whilst leading his company attacking enemy positions near Cuinchy, on the Le Bassee Canal, on the first day of the Battle of Loos. Kilby's extreme heroism and gallantry during this attack was noted and he was awarded a posthumous Victoria Cross on 30 March 1916.

Citation

Legacy
Kilby's heroism was acknowledged by the German defenders who erected a memorial cross at the location of his death.  His body was eventually found on 19 February 1929 and interred at Arras Road Cemetery, Roclincourt, Plot III, Row N, Grave 27.

In 1919 a memorial was placed in St Nicholas's Chapel, York Minster; which was inscribed with details of Arthur Kilby's deeds and awards, and contained a bust of him surmounted by the family coat-of-arms.  His name is also listed on a war memorial in St Cuthbert's Church, Peasholme Green, York.

In 2012, Kilby's Victoria Cross, along with another awarded to Private Sidney Godley, the very first VC recipient of World War I, was sold at a London auction for £276,000 each to Lord Ashcroft. Captain Kilby's medal are now part of the Lord Ashcroft Medal Collection in the Imperial War Museum in London.

References

Monuments to Courage (David Harvey, 1999)
The Register of the Victoria Cross (This England, 1997)
VCs of the First World War - The Western Front 1915 (Peter F. Batchelor & Christopher Matson, 1999)

1885 births
1915 deaths
South Staffordshire Regiment officers
British Army personnel of World War I
British World War I recipients of the Victoria Cross
British military personnel killed in World War I
People from Cheltenham
Recipients of the Military Cross
British Army recipients of the Victoria Cross
People educated at Winchester College
Graduates of the Royal Military College, Sandhurst
People educated at Bilton Grange
Missing in action of World War I
Military personnel from Gloucestershire